Hans-Werner Fischer-Elfert (abbreviated Hans-W.; born 2 September 1954) is a German professor of Egyptology at the Institut für Ägyptologie, University of Leipzig, Germany. He received his Ph.D, written under the direction of Prof. Wolfgang Helck, from the University of Hamburg. He notably took part in the writing of the Lexikon der Ägyptologie. His researches focus on ancient Egyptian literature, religion, medicine and magic.

See also
List of Egyptologists

Notes

References
Tait, John W. (2003). 'Never Had the Like Occurred': Egypt's View of Its Past. Edited by John W. Tait. London: University College London, Institute of Archaeology, an imprint of Cavendish Publishing Limited. .

German Egyptologists
Academic staff of Leipzig University
Living people
1954 births
German male non-fiction writers